Jaffna Diocese may refer to:

 Jaffna Diocese of the Church of South India
 Roman Catholic Diocese of Jaffna